Expiry Date is an Indian thriller drama web series written and directed by Shankar K Marthand, and produced by Sharrath Marar. The ensemble cast includes Tony Luke, Sneha Ullal, Madhu Shalini and Ali Reza. Shot simultaneously in Telugu and Hindi languages, it premiered on 2 October 2020 on ZEE5. The series portrays a man and a woman entangled in a  thriller-drama due to the extra marital affair between their respective spouses.

Plot
The series revolves around Vishwa and Sunitha, who get entangled in two separate police cases due to an extramarital affair between their spouses.

Cast
Tony Luke as Vishwa 
Sneha Ullal as Disha
Madhu Shalini as Sunita
Ali Reza as Sunny

Reception
Hindustan Times rated the series 4 out of 5 and appreciated the gripping plotline and hailed the direction of Shankar K Marthand for this masterpiece.

The Quint rated the series 4 out of 5 and stated that the show is a binge-worthy series which will always keep the audience at the edge of their seats.

Koimoi rated the series 3 out of 5 stars and further wrote "web series that primarily caters to the masses who like their entertainment to be fast-paced with ample masala in there, Expiry Date makes for a racy watch".

References

External links
 
 Expiry Date on ZEE5

ZEE5 original programming
Thriller web series
2020 web series debuts
Indian drama web series
Hindi-language web series
Telugu-language web series